St. Peter's Cemetery is a historic rural cemetery in eastern Jefferson County, Arkansas. The  cemetery was established in 1827, and is one of the few surviving remnants of the former community of New Gascony, one of the county's oldest communities. The cemetery has lain dormant since 1927, and is maintained by volunteers.

The cemetery was listed on the National Register of Historic Places in 1998.

See also

 National Register of Historic Places listings in Jefferson County, Arkansas

References

External links
 
 

Cemeteries in Jefferson County, Arkansas
Cemeteries on the National Register of Historic Places in Arkansas
National Register of Historic Places in Jefferson County, Arkansas
1827 establishments in Arkansas Territory
Cemeteries established in the 1820s